Iceman (German: Der Mann aus dem Eis) is a 2017 German-Italian-Austrian adventure drama film written and directed by Felix Randau. It is a fictional story about the life of Ötzi, a natural mummy of a man discovered on 19 September 1991 in the Ötztal Alps.

The film, which was filmed in the Tyrolean and Bavarian Alps, features almost no dialogue, with a minimal amount in untranslated Rhaetian.

Plot
In the Ötztal Alps, more than 5300 years ago, a Neolithic clan has settled near a creek. It is their leader Kelab's responsibility to be the keeper of the group’s holy shrine, Tineka, contained in a wooden box. While Kelab is hunting, the settlement is attacked by three men, including Krant and his son Tasar. The attackers find the shrine and take it. The other members of the tribe are brutally murdered. The only survivor is a newborn baby. Blinded by pain and fury, Kelab sets out after the murderers on a trek through the Alps, bringing with him the newborn baby and a goat for its milk to feed the baby.

He comes across a group of three men and seemingly kills two of them before realizing these are not the persons who attacked his village. They appear to be a father and son and the third man is an abductee. He decides to let the third man go. The man who he decided not to kill tries to follow him and to travel with him but Kelab instructs him to not follow him. He next meets an old man and a younger woman. They allow him to stay with them for the night and feed him by the campfire. At night, the younger woman comes to him to have sex but he rebuffs her advances.

The next day he continues on his travels but he leaves the newborn baby and goat behind with the old man and woman. He catches up to the three attackers but the attackers are higher on the mountain and shoot arrows down at him. The arrows miss but one of the attackers falls off a cliff. Kelab approaches the dead body and gouges out his eyes while screaming his dead wife and son's names. The remaining two attackers get away. Kelab pursues them high into the snowy Alps. He finally comes close to them and charges them both but falls into a crevasse. He survives the fall and he unsuccessfully tries to climb out of the crevasse.

Eventually, a rope is thrown down to him and he climbs out. It is the man who he had decided to not kill who has helped him. This man looks at him and then moves on. Krant and Tasar make it home and greet the younger man's wife, Mitar. While Mitar is comforting Tasar on his wounded leg, Kelab kills him with an arrow. Kelab and Krant fight, with Kelab overpowering and killing Krant. He returns to their camp to find the Tineka and brings Krant's body to the funeral pyre. During the night, Mitar tries to kill him. Kelab sets off again into the high alps and is suddenly struck by an arrow shot by one of the two men from earlier, completing their own revenge. Kelab rolls down the mountainside before dying in the deep snow.

Cast
Jürgen Vogel – Kelab (Ötzi)
Susanne Wuest – Kisis
André Hennicke – Krant
Violetta Schurawlow – Mitar
Franco Nero – Ditob

Reception
On the review aggregator Rotten Tomatoes, the film has an approval rating of 86% based on 22 reviews, with a weighted average rating of 6.12 out of 10. The website's critical consensus reads: "A prehistoric drama with the heart of a western, Iceman uses classic archetypes – and deft direction – to tell a stark and simple yet powerfully effective story." On Metacritic, the film has a score of 52 out of 100, based on 6 critics, indicating "mixed or average reviews".

Accolades

References

External links
 
 Der Mann aus dem Eis

2010s adventure drama films
German adventure drama films
Italian adventure drama films
Austrian adventure drama films
Films set in the Alps
Films set in prehistory
2017 drama films
Prehistoric people in popular culture
2010s German films